The  is a constituency that represents Gifu Prefecture in the House of Councillors in the Diet of Japan. It currently has three Councillors in the 242-member house.

Outline
From the first House of Councillors election in 1947 until the 1992 election, Gifu elected two Councillors to six-year terms at alternating elections held every three years. Electoral reform in 1994 increased Gifu's representation to four Councillors, which began to take effect at the 1992 election, at which two Councillors were elected.

In September 2012 Gifu had 1,684,766 registered voters, the second-lowest of the 12 prefectures that were represented by 4 Councillors at that time. By comparison, the three most populous districts of Hokkaido, Hyogo at-large district and Fukuoka districts each had more than 4 million voters but were also represented by four Councillors each. To address this malapportionment, a November 2012 amendment to the Public Offices Election Law reduced Gifu's representation (along with Fukushima's) representation to two Councillors. This change began to take effect at the 2013 election, when only one Councillor was elected in Gifu, and will be completed at the 2016 election. The district has 1,666,610 registered voters as of September 2015.

The Councillors currently representing Fukushima are:
 Takeyuki Watanabe (Liberal Democratic Party (LDP), first term; term ends in 2016) 
 Yoshiharu Komiyama (Democratic Party of Japan (DPJ), first term; term ends in 2016)
 Yasutada Ohno (LDP, first term; term ends in 2019)

Elected Councillors 
Note: Party listed is at the time of election

Election results

See also
List of districts of the House of Councillors of Japan
Gifu 1st district, one of Gifu Prefecture's five districts in the House of Representatives

References 

Districts of the House of Councillors (Japan)